Mount Churchill is a volcano in the Saint Elias Mountains and the Wrangell Volcanic Field of eastern Alaska.

Volcanic eruptions
Mount Churchill is most noteworthy as the source of the White River Ash, deposited during two of the largest volcanic eruptions in North America during the past two millennia.

The extensive ash deposits in the lowlands near the White and Yukon Rivers were first recognized in 1883, but their source remained a mystery for the next century. More detailed studies in the 1990s by the U.S. Geological Survey finally produced the definitive answer. Aerial photos showed a  elliptical, gently sloping, ice-filled depression at  just east of the present summit of Mount Churchill. This was identified as a caldera, which had formed by the collapse of the volcano's previous summit during the cataclysmic eruptions. The geological field work revealed thick young pumice deposits along the rim of the caldera which are mineralogically and chemically identical to the White River Ash.

History
Mount Churchill was first climbed in 1951 by R. Gates and J. Lindberg, but the peak was merely an unnamed satellite of Mount Bona at the time.
The mountain was named in 1965 by the Alaska State Legislature for English statesman Winston Churchill.

Churchill also lies on the northern, gentler side of the Bona massif, making it a less visually spectacular peak than some of the lower outliers of Bona such as University Peak or Aello Peak.

References

External links
 

Landforms of Copper River Census Area, Alaska
Mountains of Alaska
Mountains of Unorganized Borough, Alaska
Potentially active volcanoes
Saint Elias Mountains
Stratovolcanoes of the United States
Subduction volcanoes
VEI-6 volcanoes
Volcanoes of Alaska
Volcanoes of Unorganized Borough, Alaska
Wrangell–St. Elias National Park and Preserve
Holocene stratovolcanoes